Oxford Co., Ltd. is a South Korean toy company, based in Busan, that makes interlocking brick toys.

History
The company was first founded in 1961 as Dongjin Ind. Corp.

In 1971, toy sales company Daegoo Lucky toy corp was established.

In 1972, toy sales company Busan Lucky toy corp was established.

In 1984, toy manufacturer PAPA toy Ind. Corp. was established.

In 1992, PAPA was renamed to Oxford co., ltd.

Toy blocks
The company's small sized blocks are compatible with Lego brand bricks, and the company makes blocks in larger sizes for younger children. Oxford has licenses to make themed sets from Disney, Hello Kitty, Robocar Poli and Pororo. Oxford manufactures Kre-O bricks on behalf of Hasbro.

Clones
Oxford sets are commonly copied by Chinese toy companies Sluban and Woma, sometimes with slight changes.

Themes

Small blocks

The company produces small block sets in several themes including:
 Military
 Transport
 Town
 Fire
 Police
 Spy
 Three Kingdoms historical sets
 Gwanggaeto the Great historical sets

References

Toy companies of South Korea
Construction toys
Manufacturing companies based in Busan
Manufacturing companies established in 1961
South Korean brands
Toy companies established in 1961
South Korean companies established in 1961